Enrico Demonte (born 25 September 1988) is a former Italian sprinter.

Biography
On 7 July 2013 Enrico Demonte ran the 200 metres in La Chaux-de-Fonds, Suisse in the time of 20.45, that in addition to being the eighth-best performance all-time Italian on the distance, is also the granting of Standard's A (20:52) for participation at the 2013 World Championships in Athletics.

Achievements

See also
 Italian all-time lists - 200 metres
 Italy at the 2013 World Championships in Athletics

References

External links
 
 Enrico Demonte at G.S. Fiamme Oro web site

1988 births
Athletics competitors of Fiamme Oro
Italian male sprinters
Living people
Sportspeople from Genoa
World Athletics Championships athletes for Italy